Osdorf was a German fishing trawler that was built in 1921 as Rendsburg. Renamed in 1939, she was requisitioned by the Kriegsmarine in the Second World War for use as a Vorpostenboot, serving as V 311 Osdorf. Restored to her ownes post-war, she was sold to Norway in 1951 and converted to a cargo ship, renamed Vestland. She was renamed Sirabuen in 1952, serving until 1956 when she was lost in a collision.

Description
The engine was built by H. C. Stülcken Sohn, Hamburg, Germany. It was rated at 58nhp.

History
Rendsburg was built as yard number 523 by H. C. Stülcken Sohn, Hamburg for N. Ebeling, Altona, Germany. She was launched on 1 September 1921 and completed on 11 November. The fishing boat registration SD 112 was allocated, as were the Code Letters LDFS. On 9 March 1932, her registration was changed to BX 220, and her port of registry was changed to Bremerhaven. In 1934, her Code Letters were changed to DQPP,

On 17 October 1939, she was sold to Andersen & Co, Hamburg and was renamed Osdorf. The registration HH 259 was allocated. She participated in Operation Weserübung in 1940. On 20 April 1941, Osdorf was requisitoned by the Kriegsmarine for use as a vorpostenboot. She was allocated to 3 Vorpostenflotille as V 311 Osdorf. She was returned to her owners post-war.

On 4 July 1951, she was sold to Trygve Klonvig, Haugesund, Norway. Re-engined with a diesel engine, she was renamed Vestland. The engine was a 4-stroke single cycle single action diesel engine, It had eight cylinders of  diameter by  stroke. The engine was built by the National Supply Co., Springfield, Ohio, United. States. Her port of registry was Haugesund and the Code Letters LAIG were allocated. In 1952, she was renamed Sirabuen. Her captain was rescued by Loide Venezuela.

References

Sources

1921 ships
Ships built in Hamburg
Fishing vessels of Germany
Steamships of Germany
Auxiliary ships of the Kriegsmarine
Fishing vessels of West Germany
Steamships of West Germany
Merchant ships of Norway
Maritime incidents in 1956